SMAD may refer to:
 Soviet Military Administration in Germany, government of the Soviet occupation zone of Germany from May 1945 to October 1949
 Solvated metal atom dispersion, a method of producing nanoparticles
 SMAD (protein), proteins involved in cell signaling
 I-SMAD, inhibitory SMAD proteins
 R-SMAD, receptor regulated SMAD proteins 
Smad, Syria, a village in southern Syria